Andrew Bisset (28 November 1801 in Montrose, Angus – 28 February 1891 Fortis Green, London), was a Scottish barrister and historical writer. His writing was an influence on Henry George, who cites Bisset’s Strength of Nations, in the notes to Progress and Poverty.

Life

He graduated B.A. from Magdalene College, Cambridge in 1826. He was called to the bar at Lincoln's Inn in 1839.

He was a researcher for Richard Cobden, probably from the early 1840s, preparing a report in 1845 on agricultural districts. In the 1850s he worked for the Anti-Corn Law League; his father-in-law was T. P. Thompson, of the League. He had a commission to write on English history, particularly land law. His later writings moved into Parliamentary history.

Works
A Practical Treatise on the Law of Estates for Life (1842)
Memoirs and papers of Sir Andrew Mitchell, K. B. (1850) editor
On the Strength of Nations (1859)
Omitted Chapters of the History of England from the death of Charles I to the battle of Dunbar (1864)
History of the Commonwealth of England (1867), revised from Omitted Chapters
Essays on Historical Truth (1871)
The History of the Struggle for Parliamentary Government in England (1877)
A Short History of the English Parliament (1883) 2 vols.
Notes on the Anti-Corn Law Struggle (1884)

See also
Henry George
Richard Cobden

Notes

External links
 

1801 births
English barristers
19th-century Scottish writers
Alumni of Magdalene College, Cambridge
People from Montrose, Angus
1891 deaths
19th-century English lawyers